The 1947 Idaho State Bengals football team was an American football team that represented Idaho State College (later renamed Idaho State University) as an independent during the 1947 college football season. In their fifth season under head coach John Vesser, the team compiled a 3–5–1 record yet outscored their opponents, 166 to 137.

This was the first season that the program was known as "Idaho State", as the school had previously been named the University of Idaho, Southern Branch.

Schedule

Notes

References

External links
 1948 Wickiup football section — yearbook summary of the 1947 season

Idaho State
Idaho State Bengals football seasons
Idaho State Bengals football